Iulactis is a genus of moths of the family Xyloryctidae.

Species
 Iulactis insignis (Meyrick, 1904)
 Iulactis semifusca Meyrick, 1918

References

Xyloryctidae
Xyloryctidae genera